Arhaphe is a genus of bordered plant bugs in the family Largidae. There are 26 described species in Arhaphe. The genus is one of a small number of hemipterans known to possess a sound-producing stridulitrum, in which the hind femur is rubbed against the costal margin of the forewings.

Species
 Arhaphe arguta (Bliven, 1956)
 Arhaphe breviata Barber, 1924
 Arhaphe capitata Halstead, 1972
 Arhaphe carolina Herrich-schaeffer, 1850
 Arhaphe cicindeloides Walker, 1873
 Arhaphe deviatica Brailovsky, 1981
 Arhaphe ferruginea Stehlik & Brailovsky, 2016
 Arhaphe flavoantennata Stehlik & Brailovsky, 2016
 Arhaphe furcata Brailovsky, 1981
 Arhaphe halsteadi Brailovsky, 1981
 Arhaphe hirsuta Stehlik & Brailovsky, 2016
 Arhaphe hoffmannae Brailovsky, 1996
 Arhaphe kmenti Stehlik & Brailovsky, 2016
 Arhaphe longula Stehlik & Brailovsky, 2016
 Arhaphe magna Stehlik & Brailovsky, 2016
 Arhaphe mexicana Halstead, 1972
 Arhaphe mimetica Barber, 1911
 Arhaphe morelensis Brailovsky & Marquez, 1974
 Arhaphe myrmicoides Stehlik & Brailovsky, 2016
 Arhaphe nigra Brailovsky, 1996
 Arhaphe oaxacana Stehlik & Brailovsky, 2016
 Arhaphe pilifera Stehlik & Brailovsky, 2016
 Arhaphe pisina Brailovsky, 1996
 Arhaphe rustica Brailovsky, 1981
 Arhaphe torquata Brailovsky, 1981
 Arhaphe vegrandis Brailovsky, 1996

References

Further reading

External links

Largidae
Articles created by Qbugbot
Pentatomomorpha genera